Sapientia Education Trust is a multi-academy trust, serving schools from Wymondham, Norfolk. Sapientia Floreat is the motto of Wymondham College.

Primary academies
Wymondham College Prep School
Burston Primary School
Ghost Hill Infant and Nursery School
Great Hockham Primary School and Nursery
Old Buckenham Primary School
Rockland Primary School
Seething & Mundham Primary School
Surlingham Primary School
Tivetshall Primary School
White House Farm Primary School

Secondary academies
Framingham Earl High School, 
Fakenham Academy, Fakenham
Old Buckenham High School, Old Buckenham
Attleborough Academy, Attleborough
Stradbroke High School
Wymondham College
City Academy Norwich

References

Multi-academy trusts